Thomas Croxton (March 8, 1822 – July 3, 1903) was a U.S. Representative from Virginia.

Biography
Born in Tappahannock, Virginia, Croxton attended primary school there and, later, the Tappahannock and Rappahannock Academies.  He graduated from the law department of the University of Virginia at Charlottesville in 1842; admitted to the bar, he commenced practice in Tappahannock, Virginia.  He served as attorney for the Commonwealth from 1852 to 1865, when he resigned.  During the Civil War Croxton served on the staff of General George E. Pickett.

Croxton was elected as a Democrat to the Forty-ninth Congress (March 4, 1885 – March 3, 1887).  He was an unsuccessful candidate for reelection in 1886 to the Fiftieth Congress.  After his failure to be reelected, he resumed the practice of law and engaged in agricultural pursuits.

In 1892, Croxton was elected judge of Essex County, Virginia, and served from 1892 until his resignation in 1901.  He died in Tappahannock, Virginia, July 3, 1903 and was interred in St. John's Episcopal Churchyard. There are papers relating to his law practice at the Special Collections Research Center at the College of William and Mary.

Elections
1884; Croxton was elected to the U.S. House of Representatives with 51% of the vote, defeating Republican Robert Murphy Mayo.
1886; Croxton lost his re-election bid to Republican Thomas Henry Bayly Browne.

References

External links
Finding aid for the Thomas Croxton Papers

1822 births
1903 deaths
Virginia lawyers
Confederate States Army officers
People from Tappahannock, Virginia
University of Virginia School of Law alumni
People of Virginia in the American Civil War
Democratic Party members of the United States House of Representatives from Virginia
19th-century American politicians